La Promesa is a soap opera television series that began airing on 12 January 2023 on TVE.

Premise 
In 1913, Jana Expósito arrives in La Promesa palace (located in Los Pedroches) hellbent on avenging the death of her mother and on finding about the whereabouts of her younger brother. She meets Manuel (the younger son of Alonso Luján, the Marquis of Luján) and rescues him from a plane crash. Meanwhile bridegroom Tomás (the first born son of Alonso and the person willing to share information with Jana about her family), is stabbed by his stepmother Cruz Ezquerdo, Manuel's mother.

Cast

Production 
The series is a RTVE and StudioCanal co-production in collaboration with Bambú. Shooting locations included Palacio El Rincón in Aldea del Fresno and El Jaral de la Mira plot, as well as two film sets with an area of around 3000 m2.

Release 
The first two episodes premiered in prime time on La 1 in Spain on 12 January 2023. The regular sobremesa release began a day later on 13 January 2023. RTVE will also distribute the series in the United States and Latin America, whilst StudioCanal will handle distribution elsewhere.

References

External links 
 La Promesa on RTVE Play

2023 Spanish television series debuts
Television series set in the 1910s
Television shows set in Spain
La 1 (Spanish TV channel) network series
Television shows set in Andalusia
Spanish-language television shows